Thomas C. Van Eaton (July 27, 1862 – October 13, 1951) was an American politician in the state of Washington. He founded the town of Eatonville, Washington in 1889. He served in the Washington House of Representatives from 1895 to 1897.

References

1862 births
1951 deaths
Republican Party members of the Washington House of Representatives